Draper–Adkins House, also known as the Jenny Adkins House, is a historic home located at Milton, Sussex County, Delaware. It was built about 1840, and is a -story, five bay, single pile, wood frame dwelling clad in weatherboard.  The interior has Greek Revival style details.  It sits on a brick foundation has a lower rear wing, and has a two-story front portico with scroll-cut wooden decoration.

It was added to the National Register of Historic Places in 1973.  It is located in the Milton Historic District.

References

Houses on the National Register of Historic Places in Delaware
Greek Revival houses in Delaware
Houses completed in 1840
Houses in Sussex County, Delaware
National Register of Historic Places in Sussex County, Delaware
Individually listed contributing properties to historic districts on the National Register in Delaware